The Rock Hill Chiefs was a primary name of the minor league baseball teams based in Rock Hill, South Carolina, USA between 1908 and 1968. Rock Hill teams played as members of the South Carolina League (1908), Tri-State League (1947–1955) and Western Carolinas League (1963–1968).

Rock Hill was an affiliate of the Chicago Cubs (1950–1951), Washington Senators (1954), St. Louis Cardinals (1963–1966) and Cleveland Indians (1967–1968)

Baseball Hall of Fame members Sparky Anderson (1965, MGR) and Steve Carlton (1964) are Rock Hill Cardinals alumni.

History
The Rock Hill Catawabas played as members of the Class D level South Carolina League in 1908. The Rock Hill Chiefs then played as members of the Class B level Tri-State League from 1947 to 1955. The Rock Hill Wrens (1963), Rock Hill Cardinals (1964–1966) and Rock Hill Indians (1967–1968) played as members of the Class A level Tri-State League. Rock Hill teams were an affiliate of the Chicago Cubs in 950 and 1951, Washington Senators in 1954, St. Louis Cardinals from 1963 to 1966 and Cleveland Indians from 1967 to 1968.

The Rock Hill Chiefs won the 1950 Tri-State League Championship, playing as an affiliate of the Chicago Cubs. After finishing 4th in the regular season standings with a 73–69 record, 13.5 games behind the 1st place Knoxville Smokies, the Chiefs qualified for the playoffs. In the playoffs, Rock Hill swept Knoxville in three games. In the Finals, Rock Hill defeated the Asheville Tourists 4 games to 3 to capture the 1950 championship under manager Dick Bouknight.

Baseball Hall of Fame inductee Steve Carlton pitched for the 1964 Rock Hill Cardinals at age 19. Carlton compiled a 10–1 record with a 1.03 ERA and 91 strikeouts in 78 innings. With Carlton on the roster, the 1964 Rock Hill Cardinals finished 2nd in the eight-team Western Carolinas League. Led by manager Hal Smith, the Cardinals finished 2nd in the regular season standings with a 76–51 record, 0.5 games behind the 1st place Salisbury Dodgers (77–51) and won the first–half standings, while Salisbury won the second–half standings in the split–season format. In the playoff Final, the Salisbury Dodgers defeated Rock Hill 2 games to 1.

Led by Baseball Hall of Fame member Sparky Anderson as manager, the Rock Hill Cardinals captured the 1965 Western Carolinas League Championship. Anderson had been fired after managing the Toronto Maple Leafs of the Class AAA International League in 1964, before the Cardinals organization hired him to manage Rock Hill just before the 1965 season. After finishing 5th in the regular season overall standings with a 59–63 record, Rock Hill qualified for the playoffs by having the best second–half record, as the league had a split–season format. In the 1965 Western Carolinas League playoffs, Rock Hill defeated the Salisbury Astros 2 games to 0 in the Finals to capture the championship.

The Rock Hill team folded after the 1968 season and minor league baseball has not returned to Rock Hill, South Carolina.

The ballpark
Rock Hill teams were noted to have played at American Legion Municipal Stadium. American Legion Municipal Stadium had a capacity of 6,800 in 1949 and 8,000 in 1963, with dimensions of 301–406–330. Municipal Stadium was demolished in 1984. The ballpark was located at the corner of York Avenue & Cherry Road, Rock Hill, South Carolina.

Timeline

Notable alumni

Baseball Hall of Fame alumni
 Sparky Anderson (1965, MGR) Inducted, 2000
 Steve Carlton (1964) Inducted, 1994

Notable alumni
 Jack Brohamer (1968)
 Vic Correll (1967–1968)
 Jake Early (1954) MLB All-Star
 Wes Ferrell (1963, MGR) 2x MLB All-Star; 1935 AL Wins Leader; Cleveland Indians Hall of Fame; Boston Red Sox Hall of Fame
 Kirby Higbe (1953) 2x MLB All-Star
 William D. Mullins (1954), member of the Massachusetts House of Representatives
 Dusty Rhodes (1950–1951)
 Hal Smith (1964, MGR) 3x MLB All-Star
 Dick Tidrow (1967)
 Mike Torrez (1966)

See also
 Rock Hill Chiefs playersRock Hill Indians players Rock Hill Cardinals players

References

Defunct minor league baseball teams
Rock Hill, South Carolina
Defunct Tri-State League teams
Professional baseball teams in South Carolina
Baseball teams established in 1947
Baseball teams disestablished in 1955
Defunct baseball teams in South Carolina
Washington Senators minor league affiliates
Chicago Cubs minor league affiliates